Events from the year 1993 in Scotland.

Incumbents 

 Secretary of State for Scotland and Keeper of the Great Seal – Ian Lang

Law officers 
 Lord Advocate – Lord Rodger of Earlsferry
 Solicitor General for Scotland – Thomas Dawson

Judiciary 
 Lord President of the Court of Session and Lord Justice General – Lord Hope
 Lord Justice Clerk – Lord Ross
 Chairman of the Scottish Land Court – Lord Philip

Events 
 5 January – oil tanker  runs aground on South Mainland of Shetland, spilling  84,700 tonnes of crude oil into the sea. She is broken up by the following Braer Storm of January 1993.
 1 April
The Council Tax replaces the Community Charge as a means of raising revenue for local government.
Glasgow Caledonian University is created by merger of Glasgow Polytechnic and The Queen's College, Glasgow.
 8 May – a new Methodist church building in Haroldswick, Shetland is dedicated, the most northerly church in the British Isles.
 27 May – the Protection of Animals (Scotland) Act 1993, which increases the penalties for cruelty to animals, receives the Royal Assent.
 29 May – Rangers F.C. beat Aberdeen 2–1 to win the Scottish Cup.
 July – Jim McLean steps down as manager of Dundee United after a reign of 21 years and seven months.
 15 July – Rangers sign Duncan Ferguson for £4 million from Dundee United, a record fee between two British clubs.
 13 September – Andy Roxburgh resigns after seven years as manager of the Scotland national football team, who now have virtually no hope of qualifying for next summer's World Cup.
 1 November – Craig Brown appointed manager of the Scotland national football team.

Births
26 January – Lana Clelland, footballer 
9 May – Laura Muir, middle-distance runner
14 June – Graeme MacGregor, footballer
15 August – Vicky Wright, curler
4 September – Emma Brownlie, footballer
21 September – Kirsty Gilmour, badminton player
27 September – Sarah Robertson, field hockey player

Deaths 
 18 January – Arthur Donaldson, former Scottish National Party leader (born 1901)
 21 July – John Crichton-Stuart, 6th Marquess of Bute, architectural conservationist (born 1933 in London)
 11 October – Andy Stewart, singer (born 1933)
 24 October – Jo Grimond, former Liberal Party leader (born 1913)

The arts
 April – St Mungo Museum of Religious Life and Art opens in Glasgow.
 30 August – Irvine Welsh's novel Trainspotting is released at the Edinburgh International Book Festival.
 December – English writer Jo Rowling moves to Edinburgh where she works on her first Harry Potter novel.
 Royal Scottish Academy of Music and Drama in Glasgow becomes the first conservatoire in the United Kingdom to be granted its own degree-awarding powers.
 Peter Howson is appointed British official war artist in the Bosnian War.

See also 
 1993 in Northern Ireland
 1993 in Wales

References 

 
Scotland
Years of the 20th century in Scotland
1990s in Scotland